These are the settings, both real and imagined, in The Adventures of Tintin, the comics series by Belgian cartoonist Hergé.

Europe 

 
 Brussels: Tintin in the Land of the Soviets, Tintin in the Congo, Tintin in America, Cigars of the Pharaoh, The Blue Lotus, The Broken Ear, The Black Island, King Ottokar's Sceptre, The Crab with the Golden Claws, The Shooting Star, The Secret of the Unicorn, Red Rackham's Treasure, The Seven Crystal Balls, The Prisoners of the Sun, Land of Black Gold, Destination Moon, The Calculus Affair, The Red Sea Sharks, The Castafiore Emerald, Tintin and the Picaros, Tintin and Alph-Art
 Antwerp: Tintin in the Congo, The Blue Lotus, The Broken Ear, The Crab with the Golden Claws, The Shooting Star, Red Rackham's Treasure, Land of Black Gold
 Ostend: The Black Island
 Liège: Tintin in the Land of the Soviets
 Tienen: Tintin in the Land of the Soviets
 Louvain: Tintin in the Land of the Soviets
 
 Le Havre: The Broken Ear, Tintin in America
 Saint-Nazaire: The Seven Crystal Balls
 La Rochelle: The Seven Crystal Balls
 Paris: Prisoners of the Sun
 Marseilles: King Ottokar's Sceptre, The Blue Lotus (In the original edition, the SS Rampura (later ) is sailing via Marseilles.)
 French Alps: Tintin in Tibet
 
 Berlin: Tintin in the Land of the Soviets
 Frankfurt: King Ottokar's Sceptre
 
 Geneva: The Calculus Affair
 Nyon: The Calculus Affair
 
 London: Flight 714 to Sydney (Starting point for Tintin, Haddock and Calculus on their journey towards Australia)
 Liverpool: The Blue Lotus
 Dover, Kent: The Black Island
 Glasgow: The Black Island
 Eastdown, Sussex (fictional): The Black Island
 Kiltoch, Scotland (fictional): The Black Island
 Black Island (fictional): The Black Island (a fictional island off the Scottish coast) 
 
 Akureyri: The Shooting Star
 : The Blue Lotus (The SS Ranch is sailing via Malta)
 : The Blue Lotus (The SS Ranch is sailing via Gibraltar)
 
 
 Moscow: Tintin in the Land of the Soviets
 
 Stolbtsy: Tintin in the Land of the Soviets
 
 Santa Cruz: Tintin in the Congo (Tintin passes through the Canary Islands)
 
 Second Polish Republic: Tintin in the Land of the Soviets
 
 Naples: Tintin and Alph-Art
 Ischia: Tintin and Alph-Art
 Rome: Red Rackham's Treasure (French version, Tintin passes through Rome)
 
 Lisbon: Tintin in the Congo (In the original edition, Tintin passes through Lisbon), Cigars of the Pharaoh
 
 Prague: King Ottokar's Sceptre
 : The Black Island (mentioned)
 : The Black Island (mentioned)
 
 Belgrade: King Ottokar's Sceptre (passed through it)
 
 Monaco: Tintin and the Picaros (Japanese version, passed through it)
  Syldavia (fictional): King Ottokar's Sceptre, Destination Moon, Explorers on the Moon, Tintin and the Lake of Sharks
  Borduria (fictional): King Ottokar's Sceptre, The Calculus Affair

Africa 

 
 Belgian Congo
 Matadi: Tintin in the Congo
 
 Port Said: Cigars of the Pharaoh, The Blue Lotus (The SS Ranchi is sailing via Port Said)
 Cairo: Cigars of the Pharaoh, Flight 714 to Sydney
 The Valley of the Kings: Cigars of the Pharaoh
 
 French Morocco
 Bagghar (fictional): The Crab with the Golden Claws
 Tangier: Cigars of the Pharaoh (In the original edition, it is implied that Tintin passed through Morocco on his way to Egypt on board the SS Epomeo)
 
 Algiers: Cigars of the Pharaoh (The SS Epomeo passed through it)
 
 Tunis: Cigars of the Pharaoh (The SS Epome passed through it)
 
 Tripoli: Cigars of the Pharaoh (The SS Epomeo passed through it)

North America 

 
 New York City: Tintin in America
 Chicago: Tintin in America
 Redskin City (fictional): Tintin in America
   : Red Rackham's Treasure (passed through it)
  
 Santo Domingo : The Secret of the Unicorn (passed through it)
  was mentioned in The Secret of the Unicorn and the film.

South America 

 
 Callao: Prisoners of the Sun
 Jauga: Prisoners of the Sun
 Santa Clara: Prisoners of the Sun
  : Tintin and the Picaros (with Bianca Castafiore, passed through it)
  : Tintin and the Picaros (with Bianca Castafiore, passed through it)
  : Tintin and the Picaros (with Bianca Castafiore, passed through it)
  San Theodoros (fictional): The Broken Ear, Tintin and the Picaros
  Nuevo Rico (fictional): The Broken Ear
  São Rico (fictional): The Shooting Star (Tintin never actually visited this country, neither is anything more revealed about it except it is in South America. The country was adapted to replace the United States in post-war editions)

Asia 

 : Cigars of the Pharaoh
 Abudin (fictional)
 Mecca: Cigars of the Pharaoh (Black & White version)
 /
 British Raj
 Bombay: Cigars of the Pharaoh
 Calcutta: Tintin in Tibet (Flight stopover for Chang to Kathmandu)
 Gaipajama: Cigars of the Pharaoh (Fictional)
 New Delhi: Tintin in Tibet
 Patna: Tintin in Tibet (Flight stopover)
 
 Karachi : Flight 714 to Sydney (Japanese version)
 /
 Singapore: The Blue Lotus (The SS Ranchi passed through it), Flight 714 to Sydney]]
 
 Kathmandu: Tintin in Tibet
  China
 Shanghai: The Blue Lotus
 Nanjing: The Blue Lotus
 Tianjin: The Blue Lotus
 /
 British Ceylon
 Colombo: The Blue Lotus (The SS Ranchi passed through it)
 Sri Lanka (Ceylon): Tintin and the Picaros (mentioned of the Professor Calculus)
 
 Aden: The Blue Lotus (The SS Ranchi passed through it)
 
 Beirut: The Red Sea Sharks (Tintin arrives in Khemed via Beirut)
 
 Petra: The Red Sea Sharks (Tintin and Haddock pass by the Al-Khazneh temple)
 
 Haifa: In the original edition of Land of Black Gold, Tintin is kidnapped by Zionists to Bab El Ehr but the Zionists are later captured.
 
 Tehran: Flight 714 to Sydney (passed through it)
 
 Jakarta: Flight 714 to Sydney (Tintin arrives in Jakarta airport before continuing flight to Sydney)
 Makassar: Flight 714 to Sydney (Pilot contacts Makassar airport tower when locating Tintin's inflatable boat)
 
 Tokyo: The Blue Lotus (Mitsuhirato, a Japanese spy, contacts his superiors in Tokyo by telephone)
 Yokohama: The Blue Lotus, The Crab with the Golden Claws (passed through it)
  Khemed (fictional): The Red Sea Sharks, Land of Black Gold
 Sondonesia (fictional): Flight 714 to Sydney

Australia 

 
 Sydney: Flight 714 to Sydney

Antarctic 

   Antarctic: Prisoners of the Sun (Thomson & Thompson travel to Antarctica whilst following Calculus' pendulum.

Fictional settings in The Adventures of Tintin 

  Syldavia in the Balkans is by Hergé's own admission modelled on Montenegro, and is threatened by neighbouring Borduria—an attempted annexation appears in King Ottokar's Sceptre—this situation parallels respectively Czechoslovakia or Austria and expansionist Nazi Germany prior to World War II. It is later home to Sprodj Atomic Centre, which launches the first rocket to the moon.
  Borduria is the historical rival of Syldavia, and attempts a fascist annexation similar to the 1938 Anschluss of Austria in King Ottokar's Sceptre. Borduria is ruled by military dictator Marshal Kûrvi-Tasch, who in addition to oppressing his own people, attempts to influence Third World conflicts by sending "military advisors" to countries such as San Theodoros.
  Khemed, in Arabia. Khemed is subject to a revolution in The Red Sea Sharks and in the Land of Black Gold.
 Most of the events of Flight 714 to Sydney take place on the island of Pulau-Pulau Bompa ("pulau-pulau" is Indonesian for "islands") involving people Hergé calls the Sondonesians. Said to be undergoing a civil war or a war for independence and now rebels for hire, they may be based on separatist fighters of the Republic of South Maluku. This was a self-proclaimed republic of seismically active islands in the Molucca Sea, whose residents fought for independence from Indonesia in the 1950s and 1960s. The inclusion of Jakarta's Kemajoran airport and the radio message from Makassar just before the plane is hijacked suggests that the location is within the Indonesian archipelago. The Sondonesians' conversations in the album are spoken in Indonesian Malay (Indonesian). The Proboscis monkey which appears in the album is exclusive to Borneo.
  San Theodoros in South America, a prototypical banana republic where US-based companies and Borduria (meant as an allusion to the USSR or Cuba) vie for power, with "advisors" of local generals. The capital is Los Dopicos, which is later renamed Tapiocapolis.
  São Rico in South America. São Rico was added as a reference in a later versions of The Shooting Star. The original version had the villainous masterminds as stereotypical Jewish American puppet-masters — the later version darkens their skin tone and inserts São Rico as a reference.
  Nuevo Rico, bordering San Theodoros. The two countries go to war over oil in The Broken Ear, which is parallel to the 1930s Chaco War between Paraguay and Bolivia. The capital of Nuevo Rico is Sanfacion (a play on Asuncion, indicating that it is modeled upon Paraguay).
 Gran Chapo, after the South American Chaco region. The Broken Ear is set in a war inspired by the Chaco War.
 Pilchardania and Poldavia are both mentioned in The Blue Lotus. Pilchardania is mentioned on a newsreel that Tintin views while hiding in a cinema from the police. The Poldavian consul gets mistaken for Tintin in a beard and wig in the Blue Lotus opium den.
 Gaipajama, an Indian principality based on those that existed during the British Raj, is mentioned in Cigars of the Pharaoh.
 Saboulistan is never used in the series, but Hergè had planned to use this new country in the unfinished "Tintin and Alph-Art".
 Sethru and Jamjah, two Indian principalities during British Raj. A train commuted between this route. Mentioned in Cigars of the Pharaoh.

Outer Space 

 Outer Space. Tintin and his friends travel through outer space in Explorers on the Moon.
 Earth's Moon. The majority of Explorers on the Moon takes place on the Moon.
 Adonis. An asteroid visited by the rocket in Explorers on the Moon. Captain Haddock nearly becomes a satellite of Adonis, drunk from smuggled whisky

Alphabetical list 

 Alcazaropolis: nickname for Los Dopicos
 Bagghar: port city in Morocco
 Black Island: island in Scotland
 Borduria: country in the Balkans
 Ben More Castle: castle in Scotland
 Chavannes
 Dbrnouk: city in Syldavia
 Douma: city in Syldavia
 Eastdown: a city in England
 Gaipajama: an Indian princely state. In the original French language version, Gaipajama is called Rawhajpoutalah and is located to the north of Delhi.
 Istow: city in Syldavia
 Khemed: country on the Red Sea
 Khemikhal: port city of Khemed
 Khor-Biyong: Buddhist monastery in Tibet
 Kiltoch: city in Scotland
 Klow: capital of Syldavia
 Kragoniedin: spa town on Lake Pollishoff
 Los Dopicos: capital of San Theodoros
 Marlinshire: location of Marlinspike Hall in English versions
 Marlinspike Hall: Captain Haddock's ancestral estate
 Moltus River: river in Syldavia
 Niedzdrow: city in Syldavia
 Nuevo Rico: country in Latin America
 Pilchardania: mentioned in The Blue Lotus
 Poldavia: mentioned in The Blue Lotus
 Lake Pollishoff: Lake of Sharks in Syldavia
 Pulau-Pulau Bompa: island in Sondonesia
 Red Dog City (also known as Redskin City): a fictional midwestern city in the United States, featured in Tintin in America.
 San Theodoros: country in Latin America
 San Fación: capital of Nuevo Rico
 São Rico: country in Latin America
 Sprodj: site of an atomic research centre in Syldavia
 Sondonesia: secessionist republic (unrecognised) in Southeast Asia.
 Syldavia: country in the Balkans
 Szohôd: capital of Borduria
 Tapiocopolis: former name of Los Dopicos
 Trenxcoatl: location of ancient pyramids in San Theodoros
 Vargèse: resort town in the French Alps (also mentioned in The Valley of the Cobras)
 Wladir River: river in Syldavia
 Zlip: city in Syldavia
 Zmyhlpathernian Mountains: in Syldavia
 26 Labrador Road: address of Tintin's apartment
 38 Nightingale Road: address of The Klow, Syldavian Restaurant

References 

 
Locations
Tintin